Christopher Vera Perez de Venecia (born October 27, 1986), sometimes referred to as Toff de Venecia, is a former child actor, writer, director and a member of the Philippine House of Representatives for the 4th district of Pangasinan. He is the son of Gina de Venecia and Jose de Venecia Jr.

He finished his elementary studies at the Colegio de San Agustin and his secondary education at the Ateneo de Manila High School. He earned a bachelor's degree in Political Science at the Ateneo de Manila University and completed courses in Public Leadership at the Harvard Kennedy School.

Political career

Congressional stint
De Venecia ran under the platform B.A.G.E.T.S., which stands for Buhay na Turismo, Agrikultura, Gusali at Imprastraktura, Edukayson, Trabaho, at Serbisyong Pangkalusugan, and was elected as the Representative of the Fourth District of Pangasinan in 2016. In the 2019 elections, he was overwhelmingly elected for a second term once again representing the Fourth District of Pangasinan.

At present, he is sitting as a Deputy Majority Leader and also the Chairman of the Special Committee of Creative Industry and Performing Arts.

He is also the lead convener of the Arts and Culture and Creative Industries Bloc of the 18th Congress, with 6 Deputy Speakers and 12 Committee Chairmen as members.  

On July 10, 2020, he, along with his cousin Edward Maceda, was one of the 11 representatives who voted to grant the franchise renewal of ABS-CBN. He is the only North Luzon Representative and the only Pangasinense to grant the franchise as opposed to Conrado Estrella III (who voted to reject the franchise).

Buhay na Turismo
Congressman de Venecia was able to develop the San Fabian Biker's Trail and finish the building of the Biker's Den. He also pushed for the construction of the Tondaligan Baywalk in Dagupan City and the San Fabian Baywalk in Barangay Bolasi, San Fabian.

He also filed a bill declaring the Minor Basilica of Our Lady of the Rosary of Manaoag as a destination site.

Agrikultura
He was able to distribute water pumps to numerous farmers organization in the district providing irrigation to almost 951 hectares of land. In addition, farm machineries and equipment were also distributed to farmer beneficiaries during his first term.

A Rice Processing Center was also built in Barangay Oraan East, Manaoag in partnership with the Department of Agriculture. This facility will improve the earnings of our farmers.

An Integrated Natural Demonstration Farm was also created in Barangay Aramal, San Fabian to help push for organic farming in his district.

Gusali at Imprastruktura
During his first term, 30 multi-purpose covered courts were built, 5 barangay halls, 2 footbridges in Manaoag and San Fabian.

There were also 11 drainage systems, 12 riverbank protection projects, 11 river flood control projects constructed during his first term.

In addition 9 school buildings, 1 livelihood center in San Fabian, 2 day care centers in Mangaldan and Dagupan City, 1 Kabuhayan Center in Dagupan City, 1 Health Center, and a seawall in Bonuan, Dagupan City.

Edukasyon
In his first year in office, he was able to provide 478 college scholarships to deserving students in the Fourth District of Pangasinan. This number increased to 685 scholars in 2017 and 2018.

Trabaho
Provided Technical and Vocational Trainings to 1,048 individuals through TESDA.

Livelihood programs such as Tulong Pangkabuhayan sa Disadvantaged Workers (TUPAD) and Government Internship Programs (GIP) were also made available to constituents.

Serbisyong Pangkalusugan
Almost 22,000 individuals were beneficiaries of his district-wide Medical and Dental Missions. 153 senior citizens and PWDs were given wheelchairs and distributed BP Apparatus and Nebulizers to all the 140 Barangays in the Fourth District of Pangasinan.

Key Legislation 

The following are the key legislation of de Venecia:
Eddie Garcia Bill - An act seeking to institute policies for the protection and promotion of the welfare of workers or independent contractors in the film, television, and radio entertainment industry. 
Young Farmers and Fisherfolk Challenge Act - An act seeking to create a program to support and empower our young farmers and fisherfolk as partners in ensuring food security, agricultural development, and modernization.
Manaoag Bill - An act declaring Manaoag, Pangasinan as a tourist destination. 
Philippine Space Development Act - An act seeking to strengthen and aid in the development of agriculture, disaster risk reduction, and telecommunications, apart from space exploration. 
SOGIE Equality Bill – An act seeking the nationwide protection of LGBT rights in the Philippines
Department of Culture Bill – An act seeking the establishment of a Department of Culture from the current National Commission on Culture and the Arts
ARISE Philippines Act - An act seeking to offer various forms of assistance to MSMEs and other sectors affected by the COVID-19 Pandemic and rebuild consumer confidence. 
Anti-Hazing Act - An act that addresses violence in educational institutions, organizations, and those of community-based due to the alarming increase in the number of deaths resulting from the act of hazing. It prohibits all forms of hazing that will inflict direct or indirect physical or psychological suffering to the recruit at any stage of initiation. 
Free Irrigation Services Act  - An act that aims to address social order by offering a Free Irrigation Program to all farmers, irrigators' associations, and farmers' cooperatives through the assistance of the National Irrigation Association. 
Gabaldon School Buildings Conservation Act - An act aiming to conserve, restore, and protect the country's historical and cultural heritage and resources by focusing the government's efforts towards Gabaldon school buildings. 
Revised Agricultural Tariffication Act - An Act seeking to secure the country's staple source of food by imposing tariffs on all imports of rice. 
Department of Human Settlements and Urban Development Act - An act establishing a department responsible for the management of all housing, human settlement, an urban development nationwide. 
Philippine Qualifications Framework Act - An act that strengthens the constitutional rights of every Filipino by providing quality and accessible education at all levels by institutionalizing the PQF. 
An Act Ensuring the Preservation and Management of Protected Areas - An act that aims to continuously protect and maintain protected areas that have been notably recognized with biologically unique features from the increasing human activities that also affects these areas through the National Integrated Protected Areas System. 
San Fabian Holiday - An act that declares March 21 of every year, a special non-working holiday in the whole municipality of San Fabian, Pangasinan in commemoration of its founding anniversary. 
Edades and Bernal Museum - An act which seeks to establish an Edades and Bernal Museum in the City of Dagupan, Pangasinan.

Theater career

 Directing Experience

 ACTING EXPERIENCE

Filmography

Television

Film

References

External links 
 

Filipino male television actors
Filipino male film actors
Filipino male child actors
Filipino writers
Living people
Male actors from Pangasinan
Writers from Pangasinan
Members of the House of Representatives of the Philippines from Pangasinan
Liberal Party (Philippines) politicians
1986 births